The St. John's Church is a religious building that is located in the town of Kuala Belait, Belait district in the west of the country and Asian sultanate of Brunei, north of the island of Borneo.

The church follows the Roman rite and depends on the Apostolic Vicariate of Brunei.

This is one of the 3 Catholic churches operating in that nation being the other pro-cathedral of Our Lady of the Assumption in Bandar Seri Begawan and the Church of Our Lady of Immaculate Conception, Seria.

References

Roman Catholic churches in Brunei